The Coffin Ship is a 1911 American silent short adventure film. The film starred William Garwood.

External links

1911 films
Thanhouser Company films
American adventure films
American silent short films
American black-and-white films
1910s adventure films
1910s American films
Silent adventure films